Halysidota masoni is a moth of the family Erebidae. It was described by William Schaus in 1895. It is found in Mexico.

References

Halysidota
Moths described in 1895